Ruthin Railway Station served the town of Ruthin in Denbighshire, Wales, between the 1862 and 1962. It was the main headquarters of the Denbigh, Ruthin and Corwen Railway. It had two platforms, a bay siding and a goods shed that opened into a second bay platform. The station was demolished after its closure and the Ruthin Craft Centre was built in its place. A goods crane at the Craft Centre's car park entrance is all that remains of the station.

References

Further reading

External links

 Ruthin station on navigable 1952 O. S. map
 

Disused railway stations in Denbighshire
History of Denbighshire
Railway stations in Great Britain closed in 1962
Railway stations in Great Britain opened in 1862
Former London and North Western Railway stations
Ruthin
1862 establishments in Wales